Izzet Akgül (born 28 January 1982 in Belgium) is a Belgian footballer.

Personal life 
Akgül is of Turkish descent.

References

Belgian footballers
Belgian people of Turkish descent
Association football forwards
Living people
1982 births
R. Charleroi S.C. players
FC Sion players
Yıldırım Bosna S.K. footballers
K.S.V. Roeselare players
Denizlispor footballers
Samsunspor footballers
A.F.C. Tubize players
Pazarspor footballers
Gümüşhanespor footballers